Kim Seong-soo (born 26 December 1992) is a South Korean footballer who plays as midfielder.

Career
He was selected by Daejeon Citizen in the 2013 K League draft.  He made his debut in the league match against Suwon Samsung on 20 April 2013.

References

External links

1992 births
Living people
Association football midfielders
South Korean footballers
Daejeon Hana Citizen FC players
Goyang Zaicro FC players
K League 1 players
K League 2 players